In the Gemara, the shamir ( šāmīr) is a worm or a substance that had the power to cut through or disintegrate stone, iron and diamond. King Solomon is said to have used it in the building of the First Temple in Jerusalem in the place of cutting tools. For the building of the Temple, which promoted peace, it was inappropriate to use tools that could also cause war and bloodshed. 

Referenced throughout the Talmud and the Midrashim, the Shamir was reputed to have existed in the time of Moses, as one of the ten wonders created on the eve of the first Sabbath, just before YHWH finished creation. Moses reputedly used the Shamir to engrave  the Hoshen (Priestly breastplate) stones that were inserted into the breastplate. King Solomon, aware of the existence of the Shamir, but unaware of its location, commissioned a search that turned up a "grain of Shamir the size of a barley-corn".

Solomon's artisans reputedly used the Shamir in the construction of Solomon's Temple. The material to be worked, whether stone, wood or metal, was affected by being "shown to the Shamir." Following this line of logic (anything that can be 'shown' something must have eyes to see), early Rabbinical scholars described the Shamir almost as a living being. Other early sources, however, describe it as a green stone. For storage, the Shamir was meant to have been always wrapped in wool and stored in a container made of lead; any other vessel would burst and disintegrate under the Shamir's gaze. The Shamir was said to have been either lost or had lost its potency (along with the "dripping of the honeycomb") by the time of the destruction of the First Temple  at the hands of Nebuchadnezzar in 586 B.C.

Asmodeus
According to the deutero-canonical Asmodeus legend, the shamir was given to Solomon as a gift from Asmodeus, the king of demons.

Another version of the story holds that a captured Asmodeus told Solomon the Shamir was entrusted to the care of a woodcock. Solomon then sends his trusted aide Benaiah on a quest to retrieve it.

Gemstones
The shamir worm was also used by King Solomon to engrave gemstones. Apparently he also used the blood of the shamir worm to make carved jewels with a mystical seal or design. According to an interview with Dr. George Frederick Kunz, an expert in gemstone and jewelry lore, this led to the belief that gemstones so engraved would have magical virtues, and they often also ended up with their own powers or guardian angel associated with either the gem, or the specifically engraved gemstones.

In Islam
The Quran mentions a creature thought to be the shamir, when pointing out the ignorance of the jinn who worked for Solomon concerning the occult, and emphasizing that all knowledge rests only with God:

According to commentators such as Ibn Abbas, when Solomon died his body remained leaning on his staff for a long time, nearly a year, until "a creature of the earth, which was a kind of worm," gnawed through the stick weakening it and the body fell to the ground. It was then that the jinn knew that he had died a long time before and until then they were working hard thinking they were being supervised by him. It also became clear to humans who divined and engaged in occult activities or spirit-consulting, or worshiped the jinn that they do not possess knowledge of the occult.

In popular culture
Leonard Tushnet's story "The Worm Shamir", published in the December 1968 issue of Fantasy & Science Fiction, retells the legend in modern, quasi-scientific terms.

References

Solomon
Solomon's Temple
Jewish legendary creatures
Mythological animals
Mythological substances
Islamic legendary creatures